Kleisoreia is a village and a community of the Voio municipality in Western Macedonia, Greece. Before the 2011 local government reform it was part of the municipality of Tsotyli, of which it was a municipal district. The 2011 census recorded 44 inhabitants in the village. According to the statistics of Vasil Kanchov ("Macedonia, Ethnography and Statistics"), 237 Greek Christians lived in the village in 1900.

See also
List of settlements in the Kozani regional unit

References

Populated places in Kozani (regional unit)